Joo Woo-jae is a South Korean actor and model. He is known for his roles in dramas such as Come and Hug Me, Please Don't Date Him, Love Alert and Best Chicken.

Filmography

Film

Television series

Web series

Television shows

Web shows

Music video appearances

Radio shows

Awards and nominations

References

External links 
 

1986 births
Living people
South Korean male models
21st-century South Korean male actors
South Korean male film actors
South Korean male television actors